Al Kharjah, Saudi Arabia, is an oasis located at longitude 40.7189 east, latitude 21.0828 north.

Location
The oasis is located midway between Taaf and Maysaan, in Makkah Province.

Climate
The climate of Al Kharjah is arid and is classified as BWh in the Köppen and Geiger scale. The average annual temperature is 21.1 °C and average annual rainfall is 176 mm though the highest rainfall is in April, with an average of 39mm.

See also
Al Kharjah, Tunisia
Al Kharjah, Iraq
Oasis

References

Oases of Saudi Arabia